Roohul Amin is a politician in Afghanistan who last served as Governor of Farah Province. He was appointed by President Hamid Karzai in May 2008.

References

Governors of Farah Province
Pashtun people
Living people
People from Kunduz Province
Afghan Millat Party politicians
Year of birth missing (living people)